The Transylvania  Stakes is a Grade III American Thoroughbred horse race for three-year-olds over a distance of  miles on the turf held annually in early April at Keeneland Race Course, Lexington, Kentucky during the spring meeting. It currently offers a purse of $400,000.

History

The Transylvania Stakes is named for the heavily forested region of western Virginia known as the Transylvania Colony, which became most of Kentucky in 1792. Also Transylvania University is located in Lexington.

The event was inaugurated on 8 April 1989 and was won by Shy Tom who was trained by the Hall of Fame trainer D. Wayne Lukas and owned by William T. Young with strong stretch run in a time of 1:50 flat over the  miles distance. The event was shortened to a mile in 1996 and returned to the original distance in 2008.

The event was upgraded to Grade III event in 2003

In 2008 and 2014 the event was moved off the turf due to inclement weather and held on the all weather track.

Records
Speed  record
 miles: 1:39.46 – Stormalory  (2009)
 1 mile: 1:34.65  – Dog Watch (GB) (1998)

Margins
 lengths – Silver Max   (2012)

Most wins by a jockey
 4 – Shane Sellers (1991, 1994, 1999, 2003)

Most wins by a trainer
 4 – William I. Mott (1995, 2001, 2007, 2009)

Most wins by an owner
 2 - Stuart S. Janney III (2011, 2021)

Winners

Legend:

 
 

Notes:

† Ops Smile was first past the post but was disqualified for interference in the straight and was placed eighth. Crimson Guard was declared the winner.

See also 
 List of American and Canadian Graded races

External links 
 2021 Keeneland Media Guide

References

1989 establishments in Kentucky
Keeneland horse races
Flat horse races for three-year-olds
Turf races in the United States
Graded stakes races in the United States
Grade 3 stakes races in the United States
Recurring sporting events established in 1989